Paul Metz (17 November 1892 – 8 September 1975) was a Danish field hockey player who competed in the 1920 Summer Olympics. He was a member of the Danish field hockey team, which won the silver medal.

References

External links
 
profile

1892 births
1975 deaths
Danish male field hockey players
Olympic field hockey players of Denmark
Field hockey players at the 1920 Summer Olympics
Olympic silver medalists for Denmark
Olympic medalists in field hockey
Medalists at the 1920 Summer Olympics